The November Treaties concluded in November 1870 on the accession of the kingdoms of Bavaria and Württemberg and the grand duchies of Baden and Hesse to the North German Confederation. A new foundation was not envisaged but the North German Federation was to expand with the southern German states in order to form the German Empire.

The November Treaties are detailed as follows:
 The agreement between the North German Confederation and Baden and Hesse on the "founding" of the "German Confederation" (not to be confused with the German Confederation of 1815) on 15 November 1870.
 The treaty of the North German Confederation with Bavaria on 23 November
 The treaty of the North German Confederation with Württemberg on 25 November.
As a result, the constitution of the North German Confederation had to be adapted. Many changes had already appeared in the constitution of the German Confederation of 1 January 1871, but Württemberg had already ratified the treaty, as a result of which the new constitution had already been overtaken. Bavaria did not follow the ratification until the end of January, but allowed the legal effect to start retroactively on 1 January.

On 18 January 1871, the Emperor's proclamation in Versailles followed, which, from a legal point of view, did not constitute the founding of the empire, but a commission. The Constitution of the German Empire was adopted on 16 April to make constitutional law appropriate to the latest situation.

Background

Franco-Prussian War 

After the Austro-Prussian War of 1866, the North German states had joined the North German Confederation under the leadership of Prussia. In 1870, France under Napoleon III declared war on Prussia and thus triggered the Franco-Prussian War. France was surprised by the fact that Bavaria, Württemberg, Baden and Hesse had joined Prussia, although there had been mutual covenants of protection and trusts since 1867. 

During the war, in which the Prussians won, a near-reaching agreement emerged and the road to founding the empire was opened. Otto von Bismarck, Chancellor of the North German Confederation, pressed for diplomatic access to the remaining sovereign states, the Grand Duchy of Baden, the Grand Duchy of Hesse, the Kingdom of Württemberg and the Kingdom of Bavaria, in the sens of the Lesser German solution. Their governments differed in their unity. It therefore needed diplomatic skills to maintain the sovereignty of the southern German states at the same time and to anchor the unity of constitutional law. In addition, the foreign policies attracted the suspicion of the remaining European powers (Russian Empire, Austria-Hungary and the United Kingdom of Great Britain and Ireland) and had to be avoided.

Attitudes in Baden, Württemberg and Hesse 
The Grand Duchy of Baden was unconditionally behind the unity. Grand Duke Frederick I and Prime Minister Julius Jolly articulated requests on 3 September 1870. They had already applied to be a part of the North German Confederation in 1867 and repeatedly during the Spring of 1870, which the North German government rejected Bismarck's foreign policy considerations. 

The Kingdom of Württemberg was supported by Greater Germany-Austria. Under the influence of the Württemberg German Party, the cabinet, governed by King Charles I, sent an envoy to the German headquarters in France on 12 September, to conduct negotiations with the North German Confederation about forming an association.

The government of the Grand Duchy of Hesse supported the idea of a Greater Germany, but the Upper Hesse region and the troops of South Hesse belonged to the North German Confederation, which meant a certain predicament for the government under Grand Duke Louis III. The population and the successor to the throne, Louis IV, also supported the Lesser German solution. Accordingly, the government abandoned the Greater Germany idea and entered into negotiations with the North German Confederation.

Attitudes in Bavaria 

The Kingdom of Bavaria was the most strongly opposed to all four sovereign states of a Lesser Germany. King Ludwig II was always concerned about independence. To avoid being isolated, Bavaria entered negotiations with the proposal of a new constitutional alliance. The constitutional alliance led to the founding a new federation with a new federal constitution. 

Bavaria were promised to maintain independence and integrity of Bavaria in a letter from the Prussian king. By virtue of the treaty on 23 November 1870, between the North German Confederation and the Kingdom of Bavaria, Bavaria also retained many other so-called reserve rights, such as its own army, postal system and its own state railway, in addition to cultural and fiscal sovereignty. In January 1871, the Bavarian parliament adopted this treaty after great resistance, especially from the Bavarian patriots.

Signing 
From 22 to 26 September 1870, preparatory conferences took place in Munich. Bavaria's resistance faded, also due to talks by Otto von Bismarck in October and further influence on the Bavarian King Ludwig II. Baden and Hesse made applications for accession in October, so that pressure on Württemberg and Bavaria increased again. 

As of the end of October, negotiations at the German Headquarters near Versailles were held with authorised ministers from the four southern German states. Saxon representatives were also in attendance. At this time, the siege of Paris was still in full swing. The result of the negotiations was the unity of converting the North German Confederation into a German Confederation with the acceptance of the southern German states. The North German Confederation should be analogous to the German Federal Constitution. 

This result was concluded in the constitutional treaties of November 1870 and two separate military conventions with the four states which were to be joined: on 15 November, the treaty between the North German Confederation on the one hand and Baden and Hesse on the other were based on the unchanged acceptance of the North Germans. This changed the name of the North German Confederation to the German Confederation, even if the ratifications were still outstanding. After negotiations with Bavaria and Württemberg, the North German Federal Constitution and the most important laws of the North German Confederation were modified. In total, the federal elements were emphasised in comparison with the North German Confederation of 1867. On this new basis, Bavaria entered the agreement between the North-German Confederation and Baden and Hesse in Berlin on 23 November. Württemberg also followed on 25 November. All treaties came into force on 1 January 1871, which marks the formal birth of the German Empire.  On 8 November, agreements with Bavaria, Württemberg, Baden and Hesse followed on the agreements between Württemberg, Baden and Hesse and the North German Confederation, respectively Bavaria and the North German Confederation. 

The November Treaties required the approval of the People's Representatives of the North German Confederation as well as the popular representations, as they created a new state with the German Confederation (the name was later changed) and amended the existing North German Federal Constitution.  The parliaments of Württemberg, Baden and Hesse ratified the treaties in December 1870, Bavaria on 21 January 1871 with clear majorities. In the vote of the Northern German parliament after the third reading on 9 December 1870, the Polish, Danish and Welsh deputies voted in favour. Other opposing camps remained remote from the vote. On the same day, the Federal Council of the North German Confederation voted to change the designations to "German Empire" and "German Emperor". On 10 December 1870, the constitutional change passed through the Northern German parliament.

Integration 
The so-called "Founding of the German Empire" prepared the November Treaties by regulating the conditions of acceptance by the southern states. At the same time, the constitution itself or the political system hardly changed. Of permanent importance were the special rules for some southern states, the so-called reserve rights. Württemberg and Bavaria were allowed to collect their own consumption tax and rail tariffs and received special rights to the postal and telegraph sectors. All three states were still allowed to maintain their own armies. These rights and other exceptions remained in place until 1918, although they did not appear in constitutional texts of 1 January and 16 April 1871 respectively.

The founding of the German Empire was complete and was formed by a "foundation of the Empire from above", the agreement of the governments on the one hand, and the consent of the parliaments on the other.

See also 
 Constitution of the German Confederation 1871

References 

Treaties of the North German Confederation